Chann may refer to
Chann McRae (born 1971), American cyclist
Chann Mahi, a 1956 Pakistani Punjabi film
Chann Pardesi, a 1981 Indian Punjabi film

See also
Channing (disambiguation)